Woman's Club House (or Clubhouse) may also refer to:

 Lyons Woman's Club House, a historic building in Lyons, Georgia, U.S.
 Dawson Woman's Clubhouse, a historic log cabin in Dawson, Georgia, U.S.
 Woman's Club House (Manhattan, Kansas), a historic building

See also
 Woman's Club (disambiguation)
 List of women's clubs